Colegio Amaranto Los Cabos, BCS is a private school in Cabo San Lucas in Los Cabos, Baja California Sur, Mexico.

It includes levels preschool to high school (preparatoria).

It is associated with the Colegio Olinca of Mexico City.

References

External links
 Colegio Amaranto 

Cabo San Lucas
Education in Baja California Sur
Private schools in Mexico